The Sfax Preparatory Engineering Institute or IPEIS, is a Tunisian university establishment created according to the law N°65 on July 7, 1992. Part of the University of Sfax.

Mission 
IPEIS mission is to prepare students for the national entrance exam to engineering schools.

The Institute  deals with the implementation of pilot stations in the city of Sfax, the exchange of practices adaptable to local conditions, the carrying out of agronomic experimental analyzes and technical-economic and results processing for dissemination beyond the city.

In 2017 IPEIS got the highest passing score in the National entrance exam in Tunisia, the success rate of the institute was 91.82%.

Community life 

According to the website access statistics in national institutions and facilities in Tunisia, IPEIS ranks fourth.

Within the sports activation in the university environment, in 2020 the institute  organizes the tenth annual session of table tennis under the supervision of  the regional commission for youth and sports. This season is the first nationally of its kind with the participation of all national institutions.

Departments 
The Sfax Preparatory Engineering Institute has four independent departments
 Mathematics and Physics (MP)
 Physics and Chemistry (PC)
 Biology and Geology (PB)
 Technology (PT)

Notable Students 
 Imed Ammar

See also

Preparatory Institute 
 Tunis Preparatory Engineering Institute
 Preparatory Institute for Engineering Studies of Nabeul
 El Manar Preparatory Engineering Institute
 Monastir Preparatory Engineering Institute

Others 
 University of Sfax

References

External links 
 Official website

Universities in Tunisia
1995 establishments in Tunisia